Viliamu is a masculine given name. Notable people with the name include:

Viliamu Afatia (born 1990), Samoan rugby union player
Viliamu Lesiva (born 1965), Samoan boxer

See also
Viliam

Masculine given names